This article lists notable Austrian actors.

Actors who were active in more than one era are listed only in that era in which they started their acting career.

Silent film era (1906-1930)
Females:
Sybille Binder
Betty Bird
Hedwig Bleibtreu
Carmen Cartellieri
Mady Christians
Josefine Dora
Tilla Durieux
Olga Engl
Anna Exl
Maria Fein
Nora Gregor
Ilka Grünig
Grit Haid
Liane Haid
Jenny Jugo
Eva May
Mia May
Hansi Niese
Ida Orloff
Maria Reisenhofer
Frida Richard
Ellen Richter
Magda Sonja
Mathilde Sussin
Maria Zelenka

Males:
Wolf Albach-Retty
Ernst Arndt
Ludwig Auer
Felix Basch
Karl Baumgartner
Teddy Bill
Joseph Delmont
Ernst Deutsch
Gustav Diessl
Anton Edthofer
Karl Ehmann
Ferdinand Exl
Karl Farkas
Friedrich Feher
Willi Forst
Rudolf Forster
Alfons Fryland
Jaro Fürth
Alexander Girardi
Alexander Granach
Emmerich Hanus
Heinz Hanus
Karl Harbacher
Franz Höbling
Oskar Homolka
Paul Hörbiger
Fritz Imhoff
Hans Jaray
Oskar Karlweis
Wilhelm Klitsch
Fritz Kortner
Fred Louis Lerch
Hubert Marischka
Hans Moser
Eugen Neufeld
Max Neufeld
Alfred Neugebauer
Georg Wilhelm Pabst
Max Pallenberg
Anton Pointner
Paul Richter
Eduard Rothauser
Josef Schildkraut
Rudolph Schildkraut
Oskar Sima
Fritz Spira
Walter Slezak
Magnus Stifter
Ludwig Stössel
Erich von Stroheim
Igo Sym
Hermann Thimig
Otto Tressler
Hans Unterkircher
Eduard von Winterstein
Anton Walbrook
Friedrich Zelnik

Early sound film era (1929-1959)
Females:
Rosa Albach-Retty
Senta Berger
Vanessa Brown
Friedl Czepa
Elfriede Datzig
Vilma Degischer
Poldi Dur
Edith Elmay
Maria Emo
Maria Eis
Ilse Exl
Adrienne Gessner
Käthe Gold
Anita Gutwell
Waltraut Haas
Marte Harell
Heidemarie Hatheyer
Angelika Hauff
Judith Holzmeister
Lizzi Holzschuh
Christiane Hörbiger
Gusti Huber
Ulla Jacobsson
Gertraud Jesserer
Eva Kerbler
Doris Kirchner
Hansi Knoteck
Hilde Krahl
Ida Krottendorf
Elfriede Kuzmany
Hedy Lamarr
Lotte Lang
Susi Lanner
Lotte Ledl
Lotte Lenya
Gerlinde Locker
Sylvia Lopez
Erni Mangold
Christl Mardayn
Trude Marlen
Johanna Matz
Gerda Maurus
Elfie Mayerhofer
Marisa Mell
Edith Mill
Susi Nicoletti
Eva Pawlik
Ina Peters
Maria Perschy
Erika Remberg
Annie Rosar
Angela Salloker
Maria Schell
Romy Schneider
Marianne Schönauer
Gretl Schörg
Christine Schuberth
Alma Seidler
Traudl Stark
Gretl Theimer
Helene Thimig
Jane Tilden
Nadja Tiller
Luise Ullrich
Lizzi Waldmüller
Senta Wengraf
Paula Wessely
Gusti Wolf
Yetta Zwerling

Males:
Peter Alexander
Leon Askin
John Banner
Theodore Bikel
Karlheinz Böhm
Klaus Maria Brandauer
Siegfried Breuer
Heinz Conrads
Theodor Danegger
Helmut Dantine
Ludwig Donath
Joseph Egger
Carl Esmond
O. W. Fischer
Karl Fochler
Robert Freitag
Erik Frey
Leopold Hainisch
Otto Hartmann
Karl Hellmer
Paul Henreid
Hans Holt
Attila Hörbiger
Thomas Hörbiger
Adrian Hoven
Michael Janisch
Curd Jürgens
Alexander Kerst
Eduard Köck
Walter Kohut
Friedrich von Ledebur
Theo Lingen
Eduard Linkers
Helmuth Lohner
Peter Lorre
Paul Löwinger
Ferdinand Marian
Franz Marischka
Josef Meinrad
Kurt Meisel
Fritz Muliar
Reggie Nalder
Rolf Olsen
Karl Paryla
Nikolaus Paryla
Gunther Philipp
Eric Pohlmann
Rudolf Prack
Helmut Qualtinger
Freddy Quinn
Fred Raul
Raoul Retzer
Walter Reyer
Gregor von Rezzori
Rudolf Rhomberg
Gerhard Riedmann
Richard Romanowsky
Toni Sailer
Maximilian Schell
Otto Schenk
Karl Schönböck
Dietmar Schönherr
Heinrich Schweiger
Frederick Stafford
Viktor Staal
Erwin Strahl
Otto Tausig
Georg Tressler
Alexander Trojan
Friedrich von Ledebur
Gregor von Rezzori
Peter Weck
Kurt Weinzierl
John Wengraf
Oskar Werner
Rudolf Wessely
Bernhard Wicki

1960s to 1980s
Females:
Helga Anders
Monica Bleibtreu
Katharina Böhm
Sybil Danning
Mercedes Echerer
Andrea Eckert
Sonja Kirchberger
Dagmar Koller
Sissy Löwinger
Marianne Mendt
Christine Ostermayer
Erika Pluhar
Nina Proll
Maria Rohm
Eva Reuber-Staier
Elisabeth Trissenaar
Barbara Valentin

Males: 
Herb Andress,
Wolf Bachofner
Helmut Berger
William Berger
Wolfram Berger
Klaus Maria Brandauer
Jacques Breuer
Alfons Haider
Karlheinz Hackl
Robert Hoffmann
Udo Jürgens
Fritz Karl
Peter Kern
Werner Kreindl
Erwin Leder
Paulus Manker
Karl Merkatz
Tobias Moretti
Hans Georg Nenning
Werner Pochath
Hanno Pöschl
Lukas Resetarits
Sieghardt Rupp
Walter Schmidinger
August Schmölzer
Arnold Schwarzenegger
Oskar Werner
August Zirner

Since 1990s
Women: 
Muriel Baumeister
Mavie Hörbiger
Cindy Kurleto
Larissa Marolt
Birgit Minichmayr
Marlene Morreis
Ursula Strauss
Franziska Weisz

Men:
Alfred Dorfer
Arno Frisch
Josef Hader
Hansi Hinterseer
Edgar Honetschläger
Karl Markovics
Thomas Mikusz
Hans Georg Nenning
Michael Niavarani
Reinhard Nowak
Michael Ostrowski
Robert Stadlober
Christoph Waltz

See also
Cinema of Austria

References

 
Lists of actors by nationality
Actors
Actors